The National Trade Union Centre of Trinidad and Tobago (NATUC) is a national trade union center in Trinidad and Tobago. It was created in 1991 by the merger of the Trinidad and Tobago Labour Congress (TTLC) and the Council of Progressive Trade Unions (CPTU). It has a membership of 80,000.

The NATUC is affiliated to the International Trade Union Confederation and the Caribbean Congress of Labour.

Following the 2000 Convention, divisions took place in NATUC which resulted in the formation of the Federation of Independent Trade Unions and Non-Governmental Organisations (FITUN) as a separate trade union centre.

Affiliated Unions
Those Unions affiliated to NATUC include:

 All Trinidad Sugar and General Workers' Trade Union
 Amalgamated Workers Union
 Aviation, Communication and Allied Workers Union
 Banking, Insurance and General Workers Union
 Communication, Transport and General Workers Union
 Contractors and General Workers Trade Union
 Customs and Excise Extra Guards Association
 Electronic Media Union of Trinidad and Tobago
 Emperor Valley Zoo Staff Association
 National Petroleum Staff Association
 National Union of Domestic Employees
 National Union of Government and Federated Workers
 Oilfield Workers Trade Union
 Seamen and Waterfront Workers Trade Union
 Steel Workers Union of Trinidad and Tobago
 Transport and Industrial Workers Union
 Trinidad and Tobago Postal Workers Union
 Trinidad and Tobago Unified Teachers Association

See also

 List of trade unions
 List of federations of trade unions

References

International Trade Union Confederation
Caribbean Congress of Labour
National trade union centres of Trinidad and Tobago
Trade unions established in 1991
1991 establishments in Trinidad and Tobago